The 2009–10 Georgia Lady Bulldogs basketball team represented the University of Georgia in the 2009–10 NCAA Division I basketball season. The Lady Bulldogs compete in the Southeastern Conference.

Offseason
July 1: Rutgers will play in the eighth annual Jimmy V Women’s Classic when the Scarlet Knights host Florida on Dec. 7. This marks the fourth straight season the Scarlet Knights will take part in the game. They beat Georgia 45–34 last season. The games are part of the fundraising effort for the V Foundation for Cancer Research, which is named for the late Jim Valvano, who led North Carolina State to the national championship in 1983.
July 11: The U.S. National Team, including Georgia guard Ashley Houts, rolled to an 81–64 victory over the Russian Federation in the gold medal game of the World University Games.
July 17: Andy Landers, the first and still only full-time women's basketball head coach in the University of Georgia's history, has signed a three-year contract extension, Director of Athletics Damon Evans announced on Friday. The agreement adds to the two remaining years on Landers' existing contract and now extends through the 2013–14 season.
July 25: Former Georgia Lady Bulldog Teresa Edwards headlines the list of the inductees included in the Women's Basketball Hall of Fame's Class of 2010. The group was announced Saturday in conjunction with the WNBA All-Star Game.
July 30: The Women's Basketball Coaches Association (WBCA), on behalf of the Wade Coalition, announced the 2009–2010 preseason "Wade Watch" list for The State Farm Wade Trophy Division I Player of the Year. Georgia’s Ashley Houts has been named to the 2009–10 preseason "Wade Watch" list, which is made up of top NCAA Division I student-athletes who best embody the spirit of Lily Margaret Wade. This is based on the following criteria: game and season statistics, leadership, character, effect on their team and overall playing ability.
August 21: The 2009–10 preseason candidates list for the Women’s Wooden Award was released, naming 31 student athletes. Ashley Houts from Georgia was one of the candidates.

Regular season

Roster

Schedule

Player stats

Postseason

NCAA basketball tournament

Awards and honors

Team players drafted into the WNBA

See also
2009–10 NCAA Division I women's basketball season
2009 Georgia Bulldogs football team

References

External links
Official Site

Georgia Lady Bulldogs basketball seasons
Georgia Lady Bulldogs
Georgia
Bulldogs
Bulldogs